Fothergill Point is a low rocky coastal point  northeast of Cape Worsley, forming the west side of the entrance to Mundraga Bay and the northeast side of the entrance to Odrin Bay on the Nordenskjöld Coast, on the east side of Graham Land, Antarctica. It was named by the UK Antarctic Place-Names Committee for Ian L. Fothergill, leader and meteorological assistant at the Falkland Islands Dependencies Survey station at Hope Bay, 1959–63.

References

 SCAR Composite Antarctic Gazetteer.

Headlands of Graham Land
Nordenskjöld Coast